The 1926–27 Landsfodboldturneringen was the 14th edition of the Danish national football championship play-offs, a Danish FA-organised club football tournament between the championship clubs from each of the six regional football associations. In advance of the tournament, a play-off structure had been agreed, which meant that the winners of KBUs Mesterskabsrække were directly qualified for the national championship final against the winner of the Provincial tournament. The semi-finals consisted of two matches; on one side the champions of JBUs Mesterskabsrække played against the champions of FBUs Mesterskabsrække and in the other match, the champions of the LFBUs Mesterskabsrække tournament played against the winners of a preliminary round between the champions of SBUs Mesterskabsrække and BBUs Mesterskabsrække.

The Copenhagen FA representative, B.93, won their second national championship by defeating the Zealand FA representative and the winner of the Provincial championship tournament 1927, Skovshoved IF (this was their first title), in the final at Københavns Idrætspark on 26 June 1927. Both the national final in Copenhagen and the provincial final in Skovshoved, north of Copenhagen, were played in pouring rain. For the national final, that was refereed by Hugo Ohlsson of Helsingborg, Sweden, B.93 made changes to their regular team line-up and fielded reserves for Charles Jensen (left back) and the club's two highest scoring footballers this season, Michael Rohde (forward) and Svend Petersen (forward). This was the last edition of the Landsfodboldturneringen in its end-of-the-season cup format, which was replaced by a year-long league format, known as Danmarksmesterskabsturneringen i Fodbold, the following season.

Qualified teams

Matches

Bracket

Provincial tournament, preliminary round

Match summary 
The preliminary round was played between the representative club champions of Bornholm FA and Zealand FA. The Skovserne were reportedly very superior in the match against the bornholmerne — especially in the second half.

Match details

Provincial tournament, semi-finals

Match summaries 
The two provincial semi-finals were played between the representative club champions of Zealand FA and Lolland-Falster FA in one match and the club champions of Funen FA and Jutland FA in the other match. The match between the league champions of FBU, B 1909, and the league champions of Horsens FS (nicknamed den gule Fare fra Horsens) ended with the score of 5–0, goals all scored in the second half, after the first half had ended in a 0–0 tie in front of a record attendance of 3,500 spectators at Munke Mose in Odense (also referred to as OB's Bane; a field owned by Odense BK) including several visiting spectators from Jutland with yellow flags and/or neckties, signaling support for the away team.

B 1909 fielded the same line-up, which had been used for the regional Funen Championship replay matches in early May 1927. Fans of Horsens FS, who could no make the journey to Odense, were able to follow the course of the away match through the posting on telegram boards in the gate at the local newspaper, Horsens Avis.

Match details

Provincial Championship Final

Match summary 

The final of the Provins-Turneringen was played between the representative club champions of Zealand FA and Funen FA in whipping rain. Skovshoved IF's team line-up was the same from their semi-final match against B 1901.

The provincial championship final at the municipal owned Skovshoved Idrætspark (also referred to as Banen ved Krøyersvej), Skovshoved was initiated by B 1909 as the attacking side and after 3 minutes of play, the away team's center forward Creutz Jensen scored the first goal. During the first half, the rain started pouring down and the playing field became wet, heavy and very greasy. While B 1909 have had the upper hand in the match so far, Skovserne were awarded a free kick after 25 minutes of play, and with a quick, direct and hard kick, the ball went in B 1909's goal net, scored by Helmuth Thomas. With two minutes remaining of the first half, Creutz Jensen scored the second goal for the Odense-team, after initial play by Carl Johansen and Aksel Petersen. Only shortly hereafter, the home team was able to get an attack, where the B 1909 goalkeeper Aage Larsen caused a foul against the attacking Skovshoved IF player, which the referee, Otto Remke (affiliated to Akademisk BK), awarded the north-Zealandian team a penalty kick due to obstructions from an Odense-defender, where Helmuth Thomas scored on with no chance for a save by the niner's goalkeeper. After the first half ended with the score of 2–2, the second half started with the Zealand Championship club scoring an easy goal after just 5 seconds. No further goals were scored in the match and the 3–2 lead ended up being the final score, securing Skovshoved IF their first Provincial Championship title. Skovshoved IF's centerhalf Helmuth Thomas was hailed as the best player on the pitch during the match.

Skovshoved IF won the Final of the Provinsmesterskabsturneringen and are crowned Provinsmestre (Champions of the province). The clubs earned the right to play in the national championship final.

Match details

National Championship Final

Match summary 

B.93 won the Final of the Landsfodboldturneringen and was crowned Danmarksmestre (Danish champions).

Match details

Statistics

Goalscorers

References 

Top level Danish football league seasons
1926–27 in Danish football
Denmark